Labus, Lábus or  Labuś is a surname of Slavic origin.

Labus may also refer to:
 Labus (genus), a genus of wasps
 Mount Labus, the place of the Battle of Mount Labus, part of the Seleucid–Parthian Wars